MŠK Považská Bystrica is a Slovak football team, based in the town of Považská Bystrica. The club was founded in 1920 as SK Považská Bystrica and played in the Czechoslovak First League four times, the last time being the 1989–90 season, but never in the Corgoň liga, the first Slovak championship.

Previous names
reference
 1920–1924: ŠK
 1924–1926: Orol
 1924–1926: ŠK
 1933–1936: ŠK Munička
 1936–1948 : AC Sparta
 1948–1953 : Sokol Manet
 1953–1966 : Spartak
 1966–1968 : Sparta
 1968–1990 : ZVL
 1990–1997 : FK Sparta
 1997–2013 : FK Raven
 2013– : MŠK

Club history 
The main club sponsor Raven company ended support of the football team in Považská Bystrica, even though the club was in first place in Majstrovstvá regiónu 2012/2013 (4th level) competition after the autumn season. So the club was dissolved due to financial crisis after losing its main sponsor.

Honours
 Czechoslovakia
 1.SNL (1st Slovak National football league) (1969–1993)
  Winners (2): 1969–70, 1988–89
 Slovak Cup  (1961–)
  Runners-up (1): 1989

Slovak Republic (1939–45)
 Slovak League (1939–44)
  Winners (1): 1938–39

Current squad 

For recent transfers, see List of Slovak football transfers winter 2022–23

External links 
Official website 
  
Unofficial website

References

Football clubs in Slovakia
Czechoslovak First League clubs
Association football clubs established in 1920
MSK Povazska Bystrica